Maxim Gaudette (born June 8, 1974) is a Canadian actor from Quebec. He won both the Genie Award for Best Supporting Actor and the Jutra Award for Best Supporting Actor in 2010 for his role as Marc Lépine in the 2009 film Polytechnique.

Life 
Originally from Sherbrooke, he is the son of former hockey player André Gaudette. He graduated from the Conservatoire d'art dramatique de Montréal in 1997. He has acted in television, film and stage roles.

He is in a relationship with actress Larissa Corriveau. In April 2019 the couple had their first child, a girl. He also is father to two sons from a previous relationship .

Filmography

Film
2 Seconds — 1998
The Three Madeleines — 2000
L'Espérance — 2004
Without Her (Sans elle) - 2006
Cheech — 2006
The 3 L'il Pigs (Les 3 p'tits cochons) — 2007
Honey, I'm in Love (Le grand départ) — 2008
Polytechnique — 2009
Incendies — 2010
Lac Mystère — 2013
Our Loved Ones (Nos ëtres chers) — 2015
9 (9, le film) — 2016
Social Hygiene (Hygiène sociale) — 2021
Confessions of a Hitman (Confessions) — 2021

Television
Virginie (1996-2010)
L'ombre de l'épervier (1997)
Si la tendence se maintient (2001)
Fortier (2001)
L'héritière de grande ourse (2005)
Lance et compte (2004-2009)
Les Rescapés (2010-2012)
L'auberge du chien noir (2012-2013)
Trauma (2013)

References

External links

1974 births
Living people
Canadian male film actors
Canadian male television actors
Male actors from Quebec
Best Supporting Actor Genie and Canadian Screen Award winners
French Quebecers
Canadian male stage actors
People from Sherbrooke
Best Supporting Actor Jutra and Iris Award winners